Ruxandra Dragomir Ilie (born 24 October 1972) is a retired tennis player from Romania.

She won four singles and five doubles titles on the WTA Tour during her career. The right-hander reached her highest individual WTA ranking on 25 August 1997, when she became the No. 15 of the world. Between 2009 and 2013 she was the president of Romanian Tennis Federation. Her best performance at a Grand Slam tournament came when she got to the quarterfinals of the 1997 French Open, defeating Sonya Jeyaseelan, Yayuk Basuki, Karina Habšudová and Nicole Arendt before losing to the eventual champion, Iva Majoli.

Dragomir retired from professional tennis in 2005.

WTA career finals

Singles: 8 (4 titles, 4 runner-ups)

Doubles: 10 (5 titles, 5 runner-ups)

ITF finals

Singles (7–2)

Doubles (8–6)

Grand Slam singles performance timeline

Head-to-head records
 Serena Williams 0-1
 Venus Williams 0-3
 Martina Hingis 0-4
 Lindsay Davenport 0-7
 Anna Kournikova 2-1
 Dominique Monami 1-2
 Kim Clijsters 0-1
 Arantxa Sánchez Vicario 0-5
 Nadia Petrova 2-0

References

External links

 
 
 

1972 births
Living people
Olympic tennis players of Romania
Sportspeople from Pitești
Romanian female tennis players
Tennis players at the 1996 Summer Olympics
Grand Slam (tennis) champions in girls' doubles
French Open junior champions
Presidents of the Romanian Tennis Federation